Ptilosticha is a genus of moths in the family Schreckensteiniidae. It was erected by Edward Meyrick in 1910.

Species
 Ptilosticha bimaculata Walsingham, 1889
 Ptilosticha cyanoplaca Meyrick, 1910
 Ptilosticha incandescens Meyrick, 1910

References

Schreckensteinioidea
Moth genera